Ren Yankai  (born February 27, 1984) is a Chinese actor. He is best known for his role as Gu Zhun in the film series Tiny Times .

Filmography

Film

Television series

References

21st-century Taiwanese male actors
1984 births
Living people